Kanna Laddu Thinna Aasaiya also known as KLTA, is an Indian 2013 Tamil-language romantic comedy film directed by KS Manikandan. It stars Santhanam, Srinivasan, newcomer Sethu and Vishakha Singh. The film marked Santhanam's venture into film production with his Handmade Films. The film was co-produced by Rama Narayanan while S. Thaman scored the film soundtrack. The plot revolves around three friends who fall for the same girl, who has just moved into their neighbourhood. The movie released on 13 January 2013 to positive reviews and became a blockbuster and pongal winner of 2013 at the box office. The movie is based on Indru Poi Naalai Vaa by K. Bhagyaraj.

Plot 
Shiva, Kaalkattu Kaliyaperumal (KK), and Power Kumar (Power) are three friends with no occupation other than getting drunk and chasing girls. A girl named Sowmiya moves in with her family to the house opposite Shiva. The three friends fall for the girl's beauty and make a gentlemen's agreement to let the girl choose her boyfriend. The three attempt different methods to woo her. Shiva helps Sowmiya's aunt in household work; KK joins Sowmiya's uncle to learn singing; Power joins Sowmiya's father to learn Bharatanatyam.

One day, when none of Sowmiya's family members are home, the three eventually profess their love, leaving Sowmiya confused. Following the advice of her neighbour, Sowmiya reveals to all three that she loves actor Simbu. The neighborhood boys then decide to bring Simbu as a gift for Sowmiya's birthday, but Simbu says he does not know anyone named Sowmiya. They then hire a thug named "Kolaveri" David to kidnap Simbu, but he kidnaps Sowmiya instead when he learns he is supposed to kidnap Simbu. As Simbu refuses to help them, Shiva, KK and Power go and save Sowmiya from David, and she falls in love with Shiva, because Power and KK had earlier beaten Sowmiya's uncle and father severely; they later marry.

Cast

Soundtrack 

The music was composed by S. Thaman. The audio was released on 10 December 2012. The notable guests of the audio function were director Shankar, Simbu, actor-producer Udhayanidhi Stalin and director Rajesh to name a few.

The soundtrack features a remixed version of the song Aasaiyae Alaipolae from the 1958 movie Thai Pirandhal Vazhi Pirakkum, composed by K. V. Mahadevan and sang by Thiruchi Loganathan. The song "Love Letter" is copied from the song "Naan Unnai Vaazhthi Paadugiren" from the movie Nootruku Nooru composed by V. Kumar.

Musicperk.com rated the album 7/10 stating, "The composer Thaman has done a credible job to make sure the album’s genre is met with properly".

Release
Prior to its 13 January 2013 release, filmmaker K. Bhagyaraj filed a suit against the film stating that it used the same storyline as his 1981 film Indru Poi Naalai Vaa.  He also accused the makers of falsely claiming to have acquired the rights from his film. It was later announced that the film, upon orders of a high court, would acknowledge both Bhagyaraj and his Indru Poi Naalai Vaa story in the credits.

Critical reception 
Vivek Ramz from in.com rated it 3.5 out of 5 and stated that KLTA is a perfect Pongal treat for the family thanks to its clean humour. "Go watch it and have a blast!" N. Venkateswaran from The Times of India also gave it 3.5 out of 5 saying "Manikandan has now carved out a name for himself in the Tamil film industry"  Sify also gave it three stars writing, "Gags galore, Laughs. This one’s strictly for Kollywood junkies whose funny bones are easy to tickle", and called the film a "Jolly fun ride". Oneindia.in said "Kanna Laddu Thinna Aasaiya is a fun ride." In contrast, Behindwoods rated the film 2.5 out of 5, but said, "Replete with humor, KLTA offers what it is set out for-gives an unabashed hilarious 140 minutes" and gave the verdict that it was "an enjoyable fun ride for the festive season". Malathi Rangarajan of The Hindu said that the film was "a light-hearted fun film for the festive season, if you don’t mind the crassness, that is!" and found many similarities to older films with the idea of several men trying to woo a girl already present in Uththaravindri Ullae Vaa.

References

External links 
 

2013 romantic comedy films
2013 films
2010s Tamil-language films
Films scored by Thaman S
Indian romantic comedy films
Films involved in plagiarism controversies